The fourth season of the reality television series Basketball Wives aired on VH1 from February 20, 2012 until June 11, 2012. The show was primarily filmed in Miami, Florida and New York, New York. It was executively produced by Nick Emmerson, Alex Demyanenko, Shaunie O'Neal, Jill Holmes, Tom Huffman, and Sean Rankine.

The show chronicles the lives of a group of women who are the wives and girlfriends, or have been romantically linked to, professional basketball players in the National Basketball Association, though the title of the series does not make this differentiation, solely referring to the women as "wives".

Production
Basketball Wives debuted on April 11, 2010, with thirty-minute episodes. The second season premiered on December 12, 2010, with expanded sixty-minute episodes and featured new cast member Tami Roman. Season 3 made its debut on May 30, 2011, with new cast member Meeka Claxton. The fourth season premiered on February 20, 2012, with two new cast members, Kenya Bell and Kesha Nichols and the departure of Claxton. The fifth season premiered on August 19, 2013, with Tasha Marbury joining the cast. According to a tweet from Tami Roman, the show has been quietly though officially cancelled.

Cast

Main Cast

Kesha Nichols: Ex-Fiancée of Richard Jefferson
Kenya Bell: Wife of Charlie Bell
  Royce Reed: Ex-Dancer for Miami/Orlando
 Suzie Ketcham: Ex-Girlfriend of Michael Olowokandi
 Tami Roman: Ex-Wife of Kenny Anderson
 Jennifer Williams: Ex-Wife of Eric Williams
 Evelyn Lozada: Fiancée of Chad Ochocinco
Shaunie O'Neal: Ex-Wife of Shaquille O’Neal

Episodes

References

2012 American television seasons
Basketball Wives